Simidin is a village in the Nanoro Department of Boulkiemdé Province in central western Burkina Faso. It has a population of 925.

References

Populated places in Boulkiemdé Province